Haworthia turgida, also sometimes known as the windowpane plant, is a species of Haworthia native to the Cape Provinces. Its common name comes from the translucent panes on its leaves, which are similar to those of Haworthia cooperi and some other species in the genus. It grows in dense clusters of offsets from the base, and in its native habitat prefers rocky limestone or slate cliffs. The main type has pale green leaves but varies widely. Varieties include Haworthia turgida var. longibracteata (M.B.Bayer) and Haworthia turgida var. suberecta (Poelln.)

References

External links

turgida
Flora of the Cape Provinces
Endemic flora of South Africa
Plants described in 1819